195 (one hundred [and] ninety-five) is the natural number following 194 and preceding 196.

In mathematics
195 is:
 the sum of eleven consecutive primes: 3 + 5 + 7 + 11 + 13 + 17 + 19 + 23 + 29 + 31 + 37
 the smallest number expressed as a sum of distinct squares in 16 different ways 
 a centered tetrahedral number
 in the middle of a prime quadruplet (191, 193, 197, 199).

See also
 195 (disambiguation)

References 

Integers